Economia a.s. is a Czech media company headquartered in Prague, Czech Republic. It was founded in 1990 and it is the publisher of Hospodářské noviny, Respekt, news server Aktuálně.cz and several other news websites. From 1999,  majority shareholder of Economia was the German Verlagsgruppe Handelsblatt until it was acquired by Zdeněk Bakala in 2008.

See also 
Czech News Center
Mafra (company)

References 

Companies based in Prague
Publishing companies established in 1990
Mass media companies of the Czech Republic
Mass media in Prague
1990 establishments in Czechoslovakia